Echinostoma caproni is a species of 37-spined Egyptian echinostome. It is naturally found in Cameroon, Congo, Egypt, Madagascar, and Togo.

Echinostoma caproni uses different snails species as first and second intermediate hosts, like Biomphalaria species and Pseudosuccinea columella. It can use different rodents, such as mice, rats and the african giant shrew, as definitive hosts. However, the suitability of these definitive hosts varies markedly.  

In the definitive host the metacercariae excyst in the duodenum. The juvenile worms then move down to the ileum. About ten days after infection, E. caproni eggs appear in the host faeces. The eggs then take another ten days to develop, before miracidia appear from them. These miracidia remain infective for 8 hours after hatching. 

In mice, a single oral doses of praziquantel, artesunate, or artemether can fully clear the animal of adult E. caproni infections.

References

External links

Plagiorchiida
Animals described in 1964